Live at London Astoria 16.07.08 is the first official Ladytron live album recorded during their Velocifero tour and released in 2009.

Ladytron's show at Astoria on 15 May 2008 was cancelled because of a power failure on the stage. Live at London Astoria 16.07.08 is the recording of the rescheduled show from 16 July 2008.

Originally pressed as a one-time 1000 copy run in a simple cardboard slipcase for sales off the stage, the band later released this album on digipack format. Live at London Astoria 16.07.08 was recorded by Harm Schopman and James Gebhard and it was mixed by Daniel Woodwood at Whitewood Studios.

Track listing

References

Ladytron albums
2009 live albums